Churi Qullu (Aymara churi dull yellow, qullu mountain, "dull yellow mountain", Hispanicized spelling Choreccollo, Chorecollo) is a mountain in the Andes of southern Peru, about  high. It is located in the Tacna Region, Tarata Province, Susapaya District. Churi Qullu lies northwest of P'isaqani and southeast of Wilaquta and Janq'u Qullu.

References

Mountains of Tacna Region
Mountains of Peru